Radio College Park is the oldest operational Persian podcast in the world and a weekly audio program produced by a group of Iranian graduate students at the University of Maryland at College Park. The subjects of the programs of this podcast include science, society, art, entertainment, history, literature, interview, and report. Each program is usually constructed of 1 to 5 parts each produced by one of its collaborators.

History
The idea of Radio College Park started in Spring 2005 when a group of graduate students at the University of Maryland discussed how to create a podcast to share some of their ideas with the other members of the Iranian community at the University of Maryland in particular and the other Persian speakers in the world in general.  The technical issues were investigated and addressed, and the idea was spread out to include other Iranian graduate students at the school. Sections of the first few programs were also produced and the date of the first program was announced through the listserv of the Iranian graduate students. Finally, the first program of the Radio College Park was broadcast on June 24, 2005. In its first year of operation, Radio College Park had 52 weekly programs and one special program for the occasion of Nowruz, the Persian New Year.

Except for a period of interruption between June 2009 and October 2010, Radio College Park has had continuous weekly programs. As of November 2011, there are 262 programs published on its website.

Sections
The website of Radio College Park has multiple sections. In its home page, visitor can listen to weekly programs via audio links to the mixed program as well as each individual section. The programs are presented in several audio formats including mp3, RealAudio and zip. Also programs are recorded and presented in two quality levels where the lower quality version is smaller and easier to download and is useful for people with low-speed Internet connection especially those in Iran.

In another section of the website called Photo Album, a series of photo albums are generated with narration from the camera person. This helps the user to learn more about the subject of the pictures by hearing about them.

Audio Book is another section where several books and novels read by the collaborators of the radio are presented.

Seasons
The planning for the radio station is performed on a seasonal basis. Each season consists of 13 programs and the interval has a perfect mapping to the seasons of the nature. For example, the first season (programs 1 to 13) started at the beginning of summer 2005 and ended at the end of summer.

Featured Programs
Besides the individual sections, the radio has had a set of programs presented as a series. In the longest series, Amirali produced programs on the cultural- and art- related news of the Washington, DC area, the Metropolitan area where the University of Maryland is located. In another series, graduate students of different schools in the U.S. introduced their own schools, the offered programs and also the Iranian communities on their campuses. Also, in a series of interviews made by Bahman, graduate students of the University of Maryland talked about their fields of research.

Media coverage
Radio College Park has received some attention in the news media and on the Internet. Links to some of these reports can be found in the External Links section. Also, at end of the Persian year 1384 (late March 2006), Radio College Park was selected as the second best podcast of the year after the podcast of the journalist Masoud Behnoud, in an online poll conducted by the Internet magazine "7-Sang".

References

External links
Radio College Park Website
VOA Report on the Radio College Park (Video - Save the link to watch)
BBC Persian Report on the Radio College Park
BBC Persian Report on the Radio College Park (Audio)
Candidates of the Best Persian Podcasts of the Year 1384
The Best Persian Media of the Year 1384

Coverage on Weblogs
Mohammad Reza Sarshar
Web Line
دختر كولي

2005 podcast debuts
Asian-American culture in Maryland
Audio podcasts
Iranian-American culture
Middle Eastern-American culture in Maryland
University of Maryland, College Park
2005 establishments in Maryland